François Gaspard Adam (May 23, 1710 – August 18, 1761) was a French rococo sculptor.

A member of the Adam family of painters, François was born at Nancy, and studied under his father, Jacob-Sigisbert. He later followed his two brothers to Rome in 1730, before moving to Paris. In 1740, he took second in the Prix de Rome competition, but later won the contest and returned to Rome in 1742 to study at the Académie de France's campus there. From 1747 to 1760, Adam was the principal sculptor of Frederick the Great of Prussia. Most of his work decorates the grounds at Frederick's Sanssouci Palace in Potsdam.  He died in Paris.

External links

1710 births
1761 deaths
Rococo sculptors
Artists from Nancy, France
18th-century French sculptors
French male sculptors
Catholic sculptors
18th-century French male artists